Besipirdine (besipirdine hydrochloride, or HP749), an indole-substituted analog of 4-aminopyridine, is a nootropic drug developed for the treatment of Alzheimer's disease (AD).

History 
Besipirdine was first considered for the treatment of obsessive-compulsive disorder (OCD).  Hoechst-Roussel Pharmaceuticals, Inc. (Hoecst AG) filed a patent in July 1993 protecting the use of N-(pyridinyl)-1H-indol-1-amines, including besipirdine, for the treatment of OCD, supported by preliminary data gathered from rat studies .  In 1995, Hoechst AG filed a patent protecting the production of besipirdine, this time describing its memory-enhancing, analgetic and antidepressant qualities .  With increasing research on besipirdine uncovering its effects on the cholinergic system, Hoechst AG filed a patent in the following year to protect substituted n-(pyrrol-1-yl)pyridinamines as anticonvulsant agents
.  In the midst of Phase II clinical studies of besipirdine in Alzheimer's disease, Hoechst AG merged with Rhône-Poulenc S.A. to form Aventis Pharma Limited.  Under the new company Aventis, besipirdine ultimately failed in Phase III clinical trials due to severe cardiovascular side effects observed in a few patients in separate studies.  In January 2004, UroGene acquired exclusive development and commercialization rights to besipirdine from Aventis in order to study its application in urology
.  In February 2007, UroGene filed its own patent protecting the crystal form of besipirdine chlorhydrate, its production process, and its applications in the pharmaceutical field.  The drug is currently undergoing Phase III development for treatment of Lower Urinary Tract Dysfunctions
.

Mechanism of action 
As a member of the aminopyridine class, besipirdine enhances the release of acetylcholine by blocking M-channels, voltage-gated K+ channels, increasing neuronal excitation by depolarizing the cell.  Additionally, besipirdine antagonizes the noradrenergic α2 receptor, increasing electrically-stimulated and spontaneous [3H]norepinephrine release from cortical tissue slices, and inhibits norepinephrine uptake.  The exact pathway is not yet understood but it has been shown that besipirdine does not open sodium channels, so its consequential effect on norephinephrine release may be Ca2+-independent.  Further, [3H]norepinephrine release seems to be dependent on frequency and concentration of besipirdine in that higher frequency of stimulation causes a concentration-dependent inhibition of voltage-dependent K+ channels, which leads to inhibition of norepinephrine release.

Medical uses

Alzheimer's disease 
The most successful treatments for AD have been strategies targeting the cholinergic activity in the central nervous system, like acetylcholinesterase inhibitors.  Other treatments target the adrenergic system and have been shown to improve memory deficits associated with AD.  It was hypothesized that simultaneous treatment for both cholinergic and adrenergic deficits would be more effective than treatment that targeted individual systems alone.  Besipirdine was shown to target dysfunctional cholinergic and adrenergic systems in Alzheimer's disease. It has been suggested as an anticonvulsant because of its adrenergic effects.  Its effects on the cholinergic system may improve memory and cognitive deficits symptomatic of AD.

Other 
Besipirdine was originally suggested as a treatment for OCD due to its effects on the adrenergic and serotonergic systems.  "In vitro" studies of besipirdine indicated its potency in inhibiting serotonin reuptake in addition to norepinephrine reuptake.  "In vivo", besipirdine showed efficacy in reducing schedule-induced polydipsia (SIP) in rats.  The drug's anticonvulsant properties ultimately led Hoechst AG to pursue it as a treatment for Alzheimer's disease.
After its discontinuation in the mid-1990s, besipirdine was re-evaluated as an oral treatment for Over Active Bladder (OAB) and is currently undergoing Phase III clinical trials, under UroGene.  Interest in besipirdine as a treatment for OAB was piqued by its known effects on the adrenergic system.  In isolated studies, besipirdine showed greater potency than duloxetine on bladder capacity, micturition volume, intercontraction interval, and an increase in striated sphincter EMG activity.

Pharmacology 
Besipirdine primarily acts to enhance both cholinergic and adrenergic neurotransmission in the central nervous system.  It is administered orally at a maximum tolerated dose (MTD) of 50 mg BID.  In Phase II clinical trials, patients were administered 5 mg or 20 mg BID doses of besipirdine.  Its N-despropyl metabolite, P86-7480, exhibits transient vasoconstrictor effects, producing a pressor effect of 16 ± 4 mm Hg after intravenous administration of 0.1 mg/kg, in monkey, rat and dog models.

Pharmacokinetics 
The pharmacokinetics of besipirdine have been studied in conscious monkey.  The calculated elimination half-life (t1/2) of besipirdine and P86-7480 after oral administration of 10, 20, and 40 mg/kg doses is 7.4 ± 2.1 hours.  The t1/2 after intravenous administration of 10 mg/kg is 1.5 hours.  Besipirdine is cleared through the kidneys at 0.13 ± 0.04 mL/min/kg; only 1% of the administered dose is excreted unused via the kidneys.  In humans, using doses up to 30 mg, the t1/2 of besipirdine and P86-7480 were calculated as 3 hours, and 5.5–7 hours, respectively.  Peak plasma concentrations of besipirdine and P86-7480 were calculated as 1.5–2 hours, and 2–3 hours, respectively.

Adverse effects 
Besipirdine is reported to be well tolerated.  More severe adverse effects, such as bradycardia and postural hypotension, may have been a result of a high ratio of adrenergic to cholinergic potency caused by the metabolite P86-7480, which has direct vasoconstrictor effects.  Some studies suggest that the effects of besipirdine on cognition are reversible after withdrawal from treatment, indicating that the efficacy of the drug is primarily symptomatic and not neuroprotective.

General

See also 
 Linopirdine
 Sibopirdine

References 

Nootropics
4-Pyridyl compounds